Na Klang is a tambon (subdistrict) of Sung Noen District, in Nakhon Ratchasima Province, Thailand. In 2017 it had a total population of 6,880 people.

Administration

Central administration
The tambon is subdivided into 9 administrative villages (muban).

Local administration
The area of the subdistrict is shared by 2 local governments.
the subdistrict municipality (Thesaban Tambon) Kut Chik (เทศบาลตำบลกุดจิก)
the subdistrict administrative organization (SAO) Na Klang (องค์การบริหารส่วนตำบลนากลาง)

References

External links
Thaitambon.com on Na Klang
Na Klang TAO

Tambon of Nakhon Ratchasima Province